Amy & Isabelle is a 2001 made-for-television film produced through Oprah Winfrey's Harpo Films as part of her "Oprah Winfrey Presents" film line. It was directed by Lloyd Kramer, who had previously directed another film under the "Oprah Winfrey Presents" banner, Oprah Winfrey Presents: Mitch Albom's For One More Day. The book is based on the 1998 Elizabeth Strout book Amy and Isabelle and stars Elisabeth Shue and Hanna Hall as Isabelle and her daughter Amy.

Filming took place in South Carolina and the movie aired on ABC on March 4, 2001.

Premise
Isabelle and Amy Goodrow are a mother and daughter that are currently living in the small mill town of Shirley Falls. The two are frequently at odds, something that is partially because Isabelle keeps everyone at a distance, which strains her relationship with her daughter. When her daughter meets Peter Robertson, a substitute math teacher at her school, she quickly falls for him – something that Peter is all too willing to exploit for his own purposes. Eventually this relationship becomes public, setting off public gossip and causing a fight between Amy and Isabelle that almost completely shatters their bonds.

Cast
 Elisabeth Shue as Isabelle Goodman
 Hanna Hall as Amy Goodman
 Martin Donovan as Peter Robertson
 Conchata Ferrell as Bev
 Viola Davis as Dottie
 Marylouise Burke as Arlene
 Amy Wright as Rosie
 Ann Dowd as Lenora
 Stephi Lineburg as Stacy

Reception
Critical reception for the film has been mixed. Time commented that the film "ramps up the melodrama" while praising Shue's acting, and People Magazine stated that it was "too dependent on voice-over narration, and the film ultimately turns on a revelation that I found predictable and implausible. Fortunately it has what matters most: characters worth caring about." Dove Media was also mixed in their opinion, as they found it to be a "well-acted presentation, with a message of healing relationships and acceptance of the weaknesses of others" while also finding it "depressing and unfulfilling."

Viewership for the film was high, with 19.4 million viewers tuning into ABC.

References

External links
 

2001 films
2001 television films
ABC network original films
Fictional duos
Films about mother–daughter relationships
Films based on American novels
Films directed by Lloyd Kramer
Films set in 1971
Harpo Productions films